Phra Khanong may refer to:

Phra Khanong area, the neighbourhood in Bangkok usually referred to by the name Phra Khanong
Phra Khanong Subdistrict in Khlong Toei District, Bangkok, which covers part of the area
Phra Khanong Nuea Subdistrict in Watthana District, Bangkok, which covers part of the area
Phra Khanong District in Bangkok, which formerly covered the area
Phra Khanong Tai Subdistrict in Phra Khanong District, Bangkok, which is south of the Phra Khanong area.
Phra Khanong BTS station, which serves the neighbourhood